Lucien Konter (12 August 1925 – 20 September 1990) was a Luxembourgian footballer. He competed in the men's tournament at the 1948 Summer Olympics.

References

External links
 

1925 births
1990 deaths
Luxembourgian footballers
Luxembourg international footballers
Olympic footballers of Luxembourg
Footballers at the 1948 Summer Olympics
People from Redange (canton)
Association football midfielders
FC Rodange 91 players